

Events

Pre-1600
 763 – Following the Battle of Bakhamra between Alids and Abbasids near Kufa, the Alid rebellion ends with the death of Ibrahim, brother of Isa ibn Musa.
1525 – The Swiss Anabaptist Movement is founded when Conrad Grebel, Felix Manz, George Blaurock, and about a dozen others baptize each other in the home of Manz's mother in Zürich, breaking a thousand-year tradition of church-state union.
1535 – Following the Affair of the Placards, the French king leads an anti-Protestant procession through Paris.

1601–1900
1720 – Sweden and Prussia sign the Treaty of Stockholm.
1749 – The Teatro Filarmonico in Verona is destroyed by fire, as a result of a torch being left behind in the box of a nobleman after a performance. It is rebuilt in 1754.
1774 – Abdul Hamid I becomes Sultan of the Ottoman Empire and Caliph of Islam.
1789 – The first American novel, The Power of Sympathy or the Triumph of Nature Founded in Truth by William Hill Brown, is printed in Boston.
1793 – After being found guilty of treason by the French National Convention, Louis XVI of France is executed by guillotine.
1854 – The RMS Tayleur sinks off Lambay Island on her maiden voyage from Liverpool to Australia with great loss of life.
1861 – American Civil War starts, and Jefferson Davis resigns from the United States Senate.
1893 – The Tati Concessions Land, formerly part of Matabeleland, is formally annexed to the Bechuanaland Protectorate, now Botswana.

1901–present
1908 – New York City passes the Sullivan Ordinance, making it illegal for women to smoke in public, only to have the measure vetoed by the mayor.
1911 – The first Monte Carlo Rally takes place.
1915 – Kiwanis International is founded in Detroit.
1919 – A revolutionary Irish parliament is founded and declares the independence of the Irish Republic. One of the first engagements of the Irish War of Independence takes place.
1925 – Albania declares itself a republic.
1931 – Sir Isaac Isaacs is sworn in as the first Australian-born Governor-General of Australia.
1932 – Finland and the Soviet Union sign a non-aggression treaty.
1941 – Sparked by the murder of a German officer in Bucharest, Romania the day before, members of the Iron Guard engaged in a rebellion and pogrom killing 125 Jews.
1942 – The Jewish resistance organization, Fareynikte Partizaner Organizatsye, based in the Vilna Ghetto was established. 
1943 – As part of Operation Animals, British SOE saboteurs destroy the railway bridge over the Asopos River, and guerrillas of the Greek People's Liberation Army ambush and destroy a German convoy at the Battle of Sarantaporos.
1948 – The Flag of Quebec is adopted and flown for the first time over the National Assembly of Quebec. The day is marked annually as Québec Flag Day.
1950 – American lawyer and government official Alger Hiss is convicted of perjury.
1951 – The catastrophic eruption of Mount Lamington in Papua New Guinea claims 2,942 lives.
1960 – Little Joe 1B, a Mercury spacecraft, lifts off from Wallops Island, Virginia with Miss Sam, a female rhesus monkey on board.
  1960   – Avianca Flight 671 crashes at Montego Bay, Jamaica airport, killing 37 people.
  1960   – A coal mine collapses at Holly Country, South Africa, killing 435 miners.
1963 – The Chicago North Shore and Milwaukee Railroad ends operation.
1968 – Vietnam War, Battle of Khe Sanh: One of the most publicized and controversial battles of the war begins.
  1968   – A B-52 bomber crashes near Thule Air Base, contaminating the area after its nuclear payload ruptures. One of the four bombs remains unaccounted for after the cleanup operation is complete.
1971 – The current Emley Moor transmitting station, the tallest free-standing structure in the United Kingdom, begins transmitting UHF broadcasts.
1976 – Commercial service of Concorde begins with the London-Bahrain and Paris-Rio routes.
1980 – Iran Air Flight 291 crashes in the Alborz Mountains while on approach to Mehrabad International Airport in Tehran, Iran, killing 128 people.
1981 – Production of the DeLorean sports car begins in Dunmurry, Northern Ireland, United Kingdom.
1985 – Galaxy Airlines Flight 203 crashes near Reno–Tahoe International Airport in Reno, Nevada, killing 70 people.
1997 – The U.S. House of Representatives votes 395–28 to reprimand Newt Gingrich for ethics violations, making him the first Speaker of the House to be so disciplined.
2000 – Ecuador: After the Ecuadorian Congress is seized by indigenous organizations, Col. Lucio Gutiérrez, Carlos Solorzano and Antonio Vargas depose President Jamil Mahuad. Gutierrez is later replaced by Gen. Carlos Mendoza, who resigns and allows Vice-President Gustavo Noboa to succeed Mahuad.
2003 – A 7.6 magnitude earthquake strikes the Mexican state of Colima, killing 29 and leaving approximately 10,000 people homeless.
2004 – NASA's MER-A (the Mars Rover Spirit) ceases communication with mission control. The problem lies in the management of its flash memory and is fixed remotely from Earth on February 6.
2005 – In Belmopan, Belize, the unrest over the government's new taxes erupts into riots.
2009 – Israel withdraws from the Gaza Strip, officially ending a three-week war it had with Hamas. However, intermittent fire by both sides continues in the weeks to follow.
2009 – Zhu Haiyang decapitates Yang Xin at Virginia Tech in the first campus murder since the Virginia Tech shooting.
2011 – Anti-government demonstrations take place in Tirana, Albania. Four people lose their lives from gunshots, allegedly fired from armed police protecting the Prime Minister's office. 
2014 – Rojava conflict: The Jazira Canton declares its autonomy from the Syrian Arab Republic.
2017 – Over 400 cities across America and 160+ countries worldwide participate in a large-scale women's march, on Donald Trump's first full day as President of the United States.
2018 – Rocket Lab's Electron becomes the first rocket to reach orbit using an electric pump-fed engine and deploys three CubeSats.

Births

Pre-1600
1264 – Alexander, Prince of Scotland (d. 1284)
1277 – Galeazzo I Visconti, lord of Milan
1338 – Charles V of France (d. 1380)
1493 – Giovanni Poggio, Italian cardinal and diplomat (d. 1556)
1598 – Matsudaira Tadamasa, Japanese samurai and daimyō (d. 1645)

1601–1900
1612 – Henry Casimir I of Nassau-Dietz, count of Nassau-Dietz (d. 1640)
1636 – Melchiorre Cafà, Maltese Baroque sculptor (baptised; d. 1667)
1655 – Antonio Molinari, Italian painter (d. 1704)
1659 – Adriaen van der Werff, Dutch painter (d. 1722)
1675 – Duchess Sibylle of Saxe-Lauenburg, Margravine of Baden-Baden (d. 1733)
1714 – Anna Morandi Manzolini, Spanish anatomist (d. 1774)
1717 – Antonio María de Bucareli y Ursúa, Spanish military officer and governor of Cuba (d. 1779)
1721 – James Murray, Scottish-English general and politician, Governor of Minorca (d. 1794)
1732 – Frederick II Eugene, Duke of Württemberg, son of Karl Alexander, Duke of Württemberg, and Princess Maria Augusta of Thurn and Taxis (d. 1797)
1738 – Ethan Allen, American general (d. 1789)
1741 – Chaim of Volozhin, Orthodox rabbi (d. 1821)
1763 – Augustin Robespierre, younger brother of French Revolutionary leader Maximilien Robespierre (d. 1794)
1775 – Manuel Garcia, Spanish opera singer and composer (d. 1832)
1784 – Peter De Wint, English painter (d. 1849)
1788 – William Henry Smyth, Royal Navy officer, hydrographer, astronomer and numismatist
1796 – Princess Marie of Hesse-Kassel, consort of George, Grand Duke of Mecklenburg-Strelitz (d. 1880)
1797 – Joseph Méry, French author and journalist (d. 1866)
1800 – Theodor Fliedner, German Lutheran minister (d. 1864)
1801 – John Batman, Australian entrepreneur and explorer (d. 1839)
1804 – Moritz von Schwind, Austrian painter (d. 1871)
1808 – Juan Crisóstomo Torrico, 16th President of Peru (d. 1875)
1810 – Pierre Louis Charles de Failly, French general (d. 1892)
1811 – James Hamilton, 1st Duke of Abercorn, British statesman (d. 1885)
1813 – John C. Frémont, American general, explorer, and politician, 5th Territorial Governor of Arizona (d. 1890)
  1813   – Giuseppe Montanelli, Italian statesman and author (d. 1862)
1814 – Johann Georg Theodor Grässe, German bibliographer and historian (d. 1885)
1815 – Horace Wells, American dentist (d. 1848)
1820 – Joseph Wolf, German ornithologist and illustrator (d. 1899)
  1820   – Egide Walschaerts, Belgian mechanical engineer (d. 1901)
1824 – Stonewall Jackson, American general (d. 1863)
1827 – Ivan Mikheevich Pervushin, Russian mathematician and theorist (d. 1900)
1829 – Oscar II of Sweden (d. 1907)
1839 – Caterina Volpicelli, Italian Roman Catholic nun (d. 1894)
1840 – Sophia Jex-Blake, English physician and feminist (d. 1912)
1841 – Édouard Schuré, French philosopher and author (d. 1929)
1843 – Émile Levassor, French engineer (d. 1897)
1845 – Harriet Backer, Norwegian painter (d. 1932)
1846 – Pieter Hendrik Schoute, Dutch mathematician and academic (d. 1923)
  1846   – Albert Lavignac, French music scholar (d. 1916)
1847 – Joseph Achille Le Bel, French chemist (d. 1930)
1848 – Henri Duparc, French soldier and composer (d. 1933)
1851 – Giuseppe Allamano, Italian Roman Catholic priest (d. 1926)
1854 – Karl Julius Beloch, German classical and economic historian (d. 1929)
  1854   – Eusapia Palladino, Italian spiritualist (d. 1918)
1855 – Princess Maria Luisa of Bourbon-Two Sicilies, the youngest daughter of King Ferdinand II of the Two Sicilies (d. 1874)
1860 – Karl Staaff, Swedish lawyer and politician, 11th Prime Minister of Sweden (d. 1915)
1864 – Israel Zangwill, British author (d. 1926)
1865 – Heinrich Albers-Schonberg, German gynecologist and radiologist (d. 1921)
1867 – Ludwig Thoma, German paramedic and author (d. 1921)
  1867   – Maxime Weygand, Belgian-French general (d. 1965)
1868 – Felix Hoffmann, German chemist (d. 1946)
1869 – Grigori Rasputin, Russian mystic (d. 1916)
1871 – Olga Preobrajenska, Russian ballerina (d. 1962)
1873 – Arturo Labriola, Italian revolutionary syndicalist (d. 1959)
1874 – René-Louis Baire, French mathematician (d. 1932)
1875 – Paul E. Kahle, German orientalist (d. 1964)
1877 – Baldassarre Negroni, Italian director and screenwriter (d. 1948)
1878 – Vahan Tekeyan, Armenian poet and activist (d. 1948)
1880 – George Van Biesbroeck, Belgian–American astronomer (d. 1974)
1881 – Ernst Fast, Swedish runner (d. 1959)
  1881   – André Godard, French archaeologist, architect and historian (d. 1965)
  1881   – Ivan Ribar, Yugoslav politician (d. 1968)
1882 – Pavel Florensky, Russian mathematician and theologian (d. 1937)
  1882   – Francis Gailey, Australian-American swimmer (d. 1972)
1883 – Olav Aukrust, Norwegian poet and educator (d. 1929)
  1883   – Oskar Baum, Bohemian writer (d. 1941)
  1883   – Mathias Hynes, British tug of war competitor (d. 1926)
1885 – Duncan Grant, British painter and designer (d. 1978)
  1885   – Umberto Nobile, Italian engineer and explorer (d. 1978)
  1885   – Harold A. Wilson, English runner (d. 1932)
1886 – John M. Stahl, American director and producer (d. 1950)
1887 – Wolfgang Köhler, German psychologist and phenomenologist (d. 1967)
  1887   – Ernest Holmes, American New Thought writer (d. 1960)
  1887   – Georges Vézina, Canadian ice hockey player (d. 1926)
1889 – Pitirim Sorokin, American sociologist and political activist (d. 1968)
  1889   – Edith Tolkien, wife and muse of J. R. R. Tolkien (d. 1971)
1891 – Albert Battel, German Army lieutenant and lawyer (d. 1952)
  1891   – Francisco Lázaro, Portuguese marathon runner (d. 1912)
1895 – Cristóbal Balenciaga, Spanish fashion designer, founded Balenciaga (d. 1972)
  1895   – Daniel Chalonge, French astrophysicist and astronomer (d. 1977)
  1895   – Noe Itō, Japanese anarchist, author and feminist (d. 1923)
1896 – Guy Gilpatric, American pilot and journalist (d. 1950)
  1896   – Paula Hitler, younger sister of Adolf Hitler (d. 1960)
  1896   – J. Carrol Naish, American actor (d. 1973)
  1896   – Masa Perttilä, Finnish wrestler (d. 1968)
1897 – René Iché, French sculptor (d. 1954)
1898 – Rudolph Maté, Polish-Hungarian-American cinematographer, producer and director (d. 1964)
  1898   – Ahmad Shah Qajar, Shah of Persia (d. 1930)
  1898   – Eduard Zintl, German chemist (d. 1941)
1899 – John Bodkin Adams, British general practitioner and convict (d. 1983)
  1899   – Gyula Mándi, Hungarian footballer and manager (d. 1969)
  1899   – Alexander Tcherepnin, Russian-American pianist and composer (d. 1977)
1900 – Elof Ahrle, Swedish actor and director (d. 1965)
  1900   – Anselm Franz, Austrian engineer (d. 1994)
  1900   – Fernando Quiroga Palacios, Spanish Cardinal (d. 1971)

1901–present
1901 – Ricardo Zamora, Spanish footballer and manager (d. 1978)
1903 – William Lyon, American film editor (d. 1974)
  1903   – Raymond Suvigny, French weightlifter (d. 1945)
1904 – Puck van Heel, Dutch footballer (d. 1984)
  1904   – John Porter, Canadian ice hockey player (d. 1997)
1905 – Christian Dior, French fashion designer, founded Christian Dior S.A. (d. 1957)
  1905   – Karl Wallenda, German-American acrobat and tightrope walker, founded The Flying Wallendas (d. 1978)
1906 – Igor Moiseyev, Russian choreographer (d. 2007)
1907 – Carlo Cavagnoli, Italian boxer (d. 1991)
1909 – Todor Skalovski, Macedonian composer and conductor (d. 2004)
  1909   – Teofilo Spasojević, Serbian footballer (d. 1970)
1910 – Hideo Shinojima, Japanese footballer (d. 1975)
  1910   – Albert Rosellini, American lawyer and politician, 15th Governor of Washington (d. 2011)
  1910   – Rosa Kellner, German athlete (d. 1984)
  1910   – Károly Takács, Hungarian shooter (d. 1976)
1911 – Dick Garrard, Australian wrestler (d. 2003)
  1911   – Lee Yoo-hyung, Korean footballer and manager (d. 2003)
1912 – Konrad Emil Bloch, German-American biochemist and academic, Nobel Prize laureate (d. 2000)
1915 – André Lichnerowicz, French mathematician (d. 1998)
  1915   – Orazio Mariani, Italian sprinter (d. 1981)
1916 – Pietro Rava, Italian footballer (d. 2006)
  1916   – Zypora Spaisman, Polish midwife; American and Yiddish-language actress; producer of the Yiddish stage (d. 2002)
1917 – Erling Persson, H&M founder (d. 2002)
1918 – Jimmy Hagan, English footballer (d. 1998)
  1918   – Richard Winters, American soldier (d. 2011)
  1918   – Antonio Janigro, Italian cellist and conductor (d. 1989)
1919 – Eric Brown, Scottish-English captain and pilot (d. 2016)
1920 – Errol Barrow, first Prime Minister of Barbados (d. 1987)
1922 – Lincoln Alexander, Canadian lawyer and politician, 23rd Canadian Minister of Labour (d. 2012)
1922 – Telly Savalas, American actor (d. 1994)
  1922   – Paul Scofield, English actor (d. 2008)
  1922   – Predrag Vranicki, Croatian Marxist humanist (d. 2002)
1923 – Lola Flores, Spanish singer, dancer, and actress (d. 1995)
  1923   – Alberto de Mendoza, Argentine actor (d. 2011)
  1923   – Pahiño, Spanish footballer (d. 2012)
1924 – Shafiga Akhundova, Azerbaijani Composer, first professional female author of an opera in the East (d. 2013) 
1924 – Benny Hill, English actor, singer, and screenwriter (d. 1992)
1925 – Charles Aidman, American actor (d. 1993)
  1925   – Alex Forbes, Scottish footballer (d. 2014)
  1925   – Eva Ibbotson, Austrian-English author (d. 2010)
  1925   – Arnold Skaaland, American wrestler and manager (d. 2007)
1926 – Clive Donner, British director (d. 2010)
  1926   – Franco Evangelisti, Italian composer (d. 1980)
  1926   – Steve Reeves, American bodybuilder and actor (d. 2000)
  1926   – Roger Taillibert, French architect (d. 2019)
  1926   – Robert J. White, American neurosurgeon (d. 2010)
1927 – Rudolf Kraus, German footballer (d. 2003)
1928 – Gene Sharp, American political scientist and academic, founded the Albert Einstein Institution (d. 2018)
  1928   – Reynaldo Bignone, Argentinian general and politician, 41st President of Argentina (d. 2018)
1929 – Radley Metzger, American filmmaker (d. 2017)
1930 – Mainza Chona, Zambian lawyer and politician, 1st Prime Minister of Zambia (d. 2001)
  1930   – Valentin Filatyev, Soviet cosmonaut (d. 1990)
1931 – Yoshiko Kuga, Japanese actress
1933 – Habib Thiam, Senegalese politician (d. 2017)
  1933   – Tony Marchi, English footballer (d. 2022)
1934 – Audrey Dalton, Irish actress
  1934   – Antonio Karmany, Spanish cyclist
  1934   – Alfonso Portugal, Mexican footballer (d. 2016)
  1934   – Ann Wedgeworth, American actress (d. 2017)
1936 – Dick Davies, American basketball player (d. 2012)
1937 – Judit Ágoston-Mendelényi, Hungarian fencer (d. 2013)
  1937   – Prince Max, Duke in Bavaria, the youngest son of Albrecht, Duke of Bavaria
1938 – Romano Fogli, Italian footballer (d. 2021)
1939 – Paul Genevay, French sprinter (d. 2022)
  1939   – Friedel Lutz, German footballer
  1939   – Steve Paxton, American dancer and choreographer
  1939   – Viacheslav Platonov, Russian volleyball player and coach (d. 2005)
1940 – Jack Nicklaus, American golfer and sportscaster
  1940   – Patrick Robinson, British novelist
1941 – Sattam bin Abdulaziz Al Saud, Saudi Arabian prince (d. 2013)
  1941   – Plácido Domingo, Spanish tenor and conductor
  1941   – Richie Havens, American singer-songwriter and guitarist (d. 2013)
  1941   – Mike Medavoy, Chinese-born American film producer, co-founded Orion Pictures
  1941   – Ivan Putski, Polish-American wrestler and bodybuilder
  1941   – Elaine Showalter, American author and critic
1942 – Freddy Breck, German singer, producer, and news anchor (d. 2008)
  1942   – Eugène Camara, Prime Minister of Guinea (d. 2019)
  1942   – Han Pil-hwa, North Korean speed skater
  1942   – Mac Davis, American singer-songwriter, guitarist, and actor (d. 2020)
  1942   – Edwin Starr, American singer-songwriter (d. 2003)
  1942   – Michael G. Wilson, American producer and screenwriter
1943 – Zdravko Hebel, Croatian water polo player (d. 2017)
  1943   – Arnar Jónsson, Icelandic actor
  1943   – Alfons Peeters, Belgian footballer (d. 2015)
  1943   – Kenzo Yokoyama, Japanese footballer
1944 – Uto Ughi, Italian violinist
1945 – Pete Kircher, English drummer
  1945   – Martin Shaw, English actor and producer
1946 – Ichiro Hosotani, Japanese footballer
  1946   – Nella Martinetti, Swiss singer (d. 2011)
  1946   – Tomás Pineda, El Salvadoran footballer
  1946   – Miguel Reina, Spanish footballer
1947 – Jill Eikenberry, American actress
  1947   – Andrzej Bachleda, Polish former alpine skier
  1947   – Dorian M. Goldfeld, American mathematician
  1947   – Pye Hastings, Scottish singer-songwriter and guitarist
  1947   – Michel Jonasz, French singer-songwriter and actor
  1947   – Joseph Nicolosi, American clinical psychologist (d. 2017)
  1947   – Giuseppe Savoldi, Italian footballer
  1947   – Roberto Zywica, Argentine footballer
1948 – Zygmunt Kukla, Polish footballer (d. 2016)
  1948   – Hugo Tocalli, Argentine footballer
1949 – Trương Tấn Sang, Vietnamese politician and 7th President of Vietnam
  1949   – Clifford Ray, American basketball coach and player
1950 – Marion Becker, German javelin thrower
  1950   – Gary Locke, American politician and diplomat, 36th United States Secretary of Commerce
  1950   – José Marín, Spanish racewalker
  1950   – Billy Ocean, Trinidadian-English singer-songwriter
  1950   – Agnes van Ardenne, Dutch politician and diplomat, Dutch Minister for Development Cooperation
1951 – Eric Holder, American lawyer, judge, and politician, 82nd United States Attorney General
1952 – Marco Camenisch, Swiss activist and murderer
  1952   – Werner Grissmann, Austrian alpine skier
  1952   – Mikhail Umansky, Russian chess player (d. 2010)
1953 – Paul Allen, American businessman and philanthropist, co-founded Microsoft (d. 2018)
  1953   – Felipe Yáñez, Spanish cyclist
1954 – Thomas de Maizière, German politician of the Christian Democratic Union
  1954   – Idrissa Ouedraogo, Burkinabé director, producer, and screenwriter (d. 2018)
  1954   – Phil Thompson, English footballer and coach
1955 – Peter Fleming, American tennis player
  1955   – Jeff Koons, American painter and sculptor
  1955   – Nello Musumeci, Italian politician and President of Sicily
1956 – Robby Benson, American actor and director
  1956   – Geena Davis, American actress and producer
1958 – Matt Salmon, American politician
  1958   – Hussein Saeed, Iraqi footballer
  1958   – Sergei Walter, Ukrainian politician (d. 2015)
  1958   – Michael Wincott, Canadian actor
1959 – Sergei Alifirenko, Russian pistol shooter
  1959   – Alex McLeish, Scottish footballer and manager
1960 – Sidney Lowe, American basketball player
  1960   – Mike Terrana, American hard rock and heavy metal drummer
1961 – Kevin Cramer, American politician
  1961   – Cornelia Pröll, Austrian alpine skier
  1961   – Ivo Pukanić Croatian journalist (d. 2008)
  1961   – Gary Shaw, English footballer
  1961   – Piotr Ugrumov, Russian cyclist
1962 – Tyler Cowen, American economist and academic
  1962   – Isabelle Nanty, French actress, director and screenwriter
  1962   – Gabriele Pin, Italian footballer and coach
  1962   – Zoran Thaler, Slovenian politician
  1962   – Erik Verlinde, Dutch theoretical physicist
  1962   – Marie Trintignant, French actress (d. 2003)
1963 – Hakeem Olajuwon, Nigerian-American basketball player
  1963   – Detlef Schrempf, German basketball player and coach
1964 – Andreas Bauer, German ski jumper
  1964   – Tony Dolan, English musician and actor
  1964   – Gérald Passi, French footballer
  1964   – Ricardo Serna, Spanish footballer
  1964   – Aleksandar Šoštar, Serbian water polo player
  1964   – Danny Wallace, English footballer
1965 – Robert Del Naja, British artist, musician and singer
  1965   – Jam Master Jay, American DJ, rapper, and producer (d. 2002)
  1965   – Masahiro Wada, Japanese footballer
1967 – Artashes Minasian, Armenian chess player
  1967   – Alfred Jermaniš, Slovenian footballer
  1967   – Gorō Miyazaki, Japanese film director and landscaper
1968 – Dmitry Fomin, Soviet and Russian volleyball player
  1968   – Ilya Smirin, Israeli chess Grandmaster
  1968   – Artur Dmitriev, Soviet and Russian ice skater
  1968   – Sébastien Lifshitz, French director
  1968   – Charlotte Ross, American actress
1969 – John Ducey, American actor
  1969   – Eduard Hämäläinen, Finnish-Belarusian decathlete
  1969   – Karina Lombard, French-American actress and singer
  1969   – Tsubaki Nekoi, Japanese comic artist
1970 – Alen Bokšić, former Croatian footballer
  1970   – Marina Foïs, French actress
  1970   – Ken Leung, American actor
  1970   – Oren Peli, Israeli-American director, producer and screenwriter
1971 – Uni Arge, Faroese footballer and entertainer
  1971   – Rafael Berges, Spanish footballer
  1971   – Doug Edwards, American basketball player
  1971   – Dmitri Khlestov, Russian footballer
  1971   – Dylan Kussman, American actor
  1971   – Sergey Klevchenya, Russian speed skater
  1971   – Doug Weight, American ice hockey player and coach
1972 – Billel Dziri, Algerian footballer and manager
  1972   – Rick Falkvinge, Swedish businessman and politician
  1972   – Sead Kapetanović, Bosnian footballer
  1972   – Yasunori Mitsuda, Japanese composer and producer
  1972   – Cat Power, American singer, musician and actress
  1972   – Shawn Rojeski, American curler
  1972   – Sabina Valbusa, Italian cross-country skier
1973 – Rob Hayles, English cyclist
  1973   – Chris Kilmore, American musician and DJ
  1973   – Edvinas Krungolcas, Lithuanian modern pentathlete
  1973   – Flavio Maestri, Peruvian footballer
1974 – Malena Alterio, Spanish actress
  1974   – Maxwell Atoms, American animator, screenwriter and voice actor
  1974   – Kim Dotcom, German-Finnish Internet entrepreneur and political activist
  1974   – Arthémon Hatungimana, Burundian middle-distance runner
  1974   – Vincent Laresca, American actor
  1974   – Ulrich Le Pen, French footballer
  1974   – Marco Zanotti, Italian cyclist
1975 – Nicky Butt, English footballer and coach
  1975   – Casey FitzRandolph, American speedskater
  1975   – Yuji Ide, Japanese race car driver
  1975   – Ito, Spanish footballer and manager
  1975   – Willem Korsten, Dutch footballer 
  1975   – Jason Moran, American jazz pianist, composer and educator
  1975   – Florin Șerban, Romanian director
  1975   – Alyaksandr Yermakovich, Belarusian footballer and manager
1976 – Aivaras Abromavičius, Lithuanian-Ukrainian banker and politician; 15th Ukrainian Minister of Economic Development
  1976   – Raivis Belohvoščiks, Latvian cyclist
  1976   – Emma Bunton, English singer
  1976   – Lars Eidinger, German actor
  1976   – Giorgio Frezzolini, Italian footballer
  1976   – Igors Stepanovs, Latvian footballer
1977 – Hussein Abdulghani, Saudi Arabian footballer
  1977   – Bradley Carnell, South African footballer
  1977   – John DeSantis, Canadian actor
  1977   – Kirsten Klose, German hammer thrower
  1977   – Denis Lunghi, Italian cyclist
  1977   – Ulrike Maisch, German runner
  1977   – Phil Neville, English footballer and manager
  1977   – Michael Ruffin, American basketball player
  1977   – Jerry Trainor, American actor, director, and producer
1978 – Faris Al-Sultan, German triathlete
  1978   – Peter von Allmen, Swiss cross-country skier
  1978   – Hernán Rodrigo López, Uruguayan footballer
  1978   – Andrei Zyuzin, Russian ice hockey player
1979 – Quinton Jacobs, Namibian footballer
  1979   – Melendi, Spanish singer
  1979   – Brian O'Driscoll, Irish rugby player
1980 – Karsten Forsterling, Australian rower
  1980   – Dave Kitson, English footballer and manager
  1980   – Lee Kyung-won, South Korean badminton player
  1980   – Kevin McKenna, Canadian soccer player
  1980   – Nana Mizuki, Japanese singer-songwriter and voice actress
  1980   – Xavier Pons, Spanish rally diver
  1980   – Mari Possa, El Salvadoran pornographic actress
  1980   – Bratislav Ristić, Serbian footballer
1981 – Gillian Chung, Hong Kong singer-songwriter and actress
  1981   – Wu Hanxiong, Chinese fencer
  1981   – Dany Heatley, Canadian ice hockey player
  1981   – Andy Lee, South Korean singer and actor
  1981   – Izabella Miko, Polish actress, dancer, and producer
  1981   – Shawn Redhage, American-Australian basketball player
  1981   – Michel Teló, Brazilian singer-songwriter
  1981   – Jung Ryeo-won, South Korean actress
  1981   – David F. Sandberg, Swedish filmmaker
1982 – Richard José Blanco, Venezuelan footballer
  1982   – Adriano Ferreira Martins, Brazilian footballer
  1982   – Nicolas Mahut, French tennis player
  1982   – Sarah Ourahmoune, French boxer
  1982   – Simon Rolfes, German footballer
1983 – Alex Acker, American basketball player
  1983   – Svetlana Khodchenkova, Russian actress
  1983   – Marieke van den Ham, Dutch water polo player
  1983   – Asael Lubotzky, Israeli physician, author and molecular biologist 
  1983   – Maryse Ouellet, French-Canadian wrestler
  1983   – Álvaro Quirós, Spanish golfer
  1983   – Francesca Segat, Italian swimmer
  1983   – Moritz Volz, German footballer 
  1983   – Kelly VanderBeek, Canadian alpine skier
1984 – Luke Grimes, American actor
  1984   – Alex Koslov, Moldovan-American wrestler
  1984   – Haloti Ngata, American football player
1985 – Artur Beterbiev, Russian boxer
  1985   – Aura Dione, Danish singer and songwriter
  1985   – Yumi Hara, Japanese voice actress and singer
  1985   – Sasha Pivovarova, Russian model and actress
  1985   – Rodrigo San Miguel, Spanish basketball player
  1985   – Ri Se-gwang, North Korean artistic gymnast
  1985   – Dmitri Sokolov, Russian basketball player
  1985   – Ryan Suter, American ice hockey player
1986 – César Arzo, Spanish footballer
  1986   – Edson Barboza, Brazilian mixed martial artist
  1986   – João Gomes Júnior, Brazilian swimmer
  1986   – Javi López, Spanish footballer
  1986   – Gina Mambrú, Dominican Republic volleyball player
  1986   – Jonathan Quick, American ice hockey player
  1986   – Mike Taylor, American basketball player
  1986   – Óscar Vílchez, Peruvian footballer
  1986   – Sushant Singh Rajput, Indian actor (d. 2020)
1987 – Ioannis Athanasoulas, Greek basketball player
  1987   – Andrei Cojocari, Moldovan international footballer
  1987   – Brandon Crawford, American baseball player
  1987   – Aida Hadzialic, Swedish politician
  1987   – Shaun Keeling, South African rower
  1987   – Augustine Kiprono Choge, Kenyan runner
  1987   – Darren Helm, Canadian ice hockey player
  1987   – Will Johnson, Canadian footballer
  1987   – Dominik Roels, German cyclist
  1987   – Maša Zec Peškirič, Slovenian tennis player
  1987   – Ikumi Yoshimatsu, Japanese actress
1988 – Glaiza de Castro, Filipino actress and singer
  1988   – Ashton Eaton, American decathlete
  1988   – Rolands Freimanis, Latvian basketball player
  1988   – Vanessa Hessler, Italian-American model and actress
  1988   – Aleksandar Lazevski, Macedonian footballer
  1988   – Ángel Mena, Ecuadorian footballer
  1988   – Valérie Tétreault, Canadian tennis player
  1988   – Pieter Timmers, Belgian swimmer
  1988   – Nemanja Tomić, Serbian footballer
1989 – Doğuş Balbay, Turkish basketball player
  1989   – Kayla Banwarth, American indoor volleyball player
  1989   – Férébory Doré, Congolese footballer
  1989   – Sergey Fesikov, Russian swimmer
  1989   – Justin Houston, American football player
  1989   – Henrikh Mkhitaryan, Armenian footballer
  1989   – Matteo Pelucchi, Italian cyclist
  1989   – Zhang Shuai, Chinese tennis player
1990 – Arash Afshin, Iranian footballer
  1990   – Diogo Amado, Portuguese footballer
  1990   – Andriy Bohdanov, Ukrainian footballer
  1990   – Kelly Rohrbach, American model and actress
  1990   – André Martins, Portuguese footballer
  1990   – Knowledge Musona, Zimbabwean footballer
  1990   – Jacob Smith, American actor
  1990   – Doni Tata Pradita, Indonesian motorcycle racer
1991 – Ali Al-Busaidi, Omani footballer
  1991   – Jan Hirt, Czech cyclist
  1991   – Marta Pagnini, Italian gymnast
1992 – Verónica Cepede Royg, Paraguayan tennis player
  1992   – Sven Erik Bystrøm, Norwegian cyclist
  1992   – James Duckworth, Australian tennis player
  1992   – Kwame Karikari, Ghanaian footballer
  1992   – Nicolás Mezquida, Uruguayan footballer
  1992   – Roland Szolnoki, Hungarian footballer
1993 – Muralha, Brazilian footballer
1994 – Amin Affane, Swedish footballer
  1994   – Laura Robson, Australian-English tennis player
  1994   – Booboo Stewart, American actor
1995 – Yulia Belorukova, Russian cross-country skier
  1995   – Nguyễn Công Phượng, Vietnamese footballer
  1995   – Marine Johannes, French basketball player
  1995   – Alanna Kennedy, Australian footballer
1996 – Marco Asensio, Spanish footballer
1997 – Jeremy Shada, American actor, musician and singer
  1997   – Ilia Topuria, German-Georgian mixed martial artist
1999 – Rubina Ali, Indian actress
2004 – Princess Ingrid Alexandra of Norway

Deaths

Pre-1600
420 – Yazdegerd I, king of the Sassanid Empire
 496 – Epiphanius of Pavia, Italian bishop and saint (b. 438)
 917 – Erchanger, Duke of Swabia (b. 880)
 918 – Liu Zhijun, Chinese general
 939 – Yang Pu, Chinese emperor (b. 900)
 942 – An Chongrong, Chinese general (Five Dynasties)
 945 – Yang Tan, Chinese general and governor
1118 – Pope Paschal II (b. 1050)
1203 – Agnes II, Abbess of Quedlinburg (b. 1139)
1320 – Árni Helgason, Icelandic bishop (b. c. 1260)
1527 – Juan de Grijalva, Spanish explorer (b. 1489)
1546 – Azai Sukemasa, Japanese daimyō (b. 1491)

1601–1900
1609 – Joseph Justus Scaliger, French historian and scholar (b. 1540)
1638 – Ignazio Donati, Italian composer (b. 1570)
1670 – Claude Duval, French highwayman (b. 1643)
1683 – Anthony Ashley Cooper, 1st Earl of Shaftesbury, English politician, Chancellor of the Exchequer (b. 1621)
1699 – Obadiah Walker, English historian and academic (b. 1616)
1706 – Adrien Baillet, French scholar and critic (b. 1649)
1710 – Johann Georg Gichtel, German mystic and critic (b. 1638)
1722 – Charles Paulet, 2nd Duke of Bolton, English politician, Lord Lieutenant of Ireland (b. 1661)
1731 – Ignjat Đurđević, Croatian poet and translator (b. 1675)
1773 – Alexis Piron, French playwright and author (b. 1689)
1774 – Mustafa III, Ottoman sultan (b. 1717)
1775 – Yemelyan Pugachev, Russian rebel (b. 1742)
1789 – Baron d'Holbach, French-German philosopher and author (b. 1723)
1793 – Louis XVI of France (b. 1754)
1795 – Samuel Wallis, English navigator and explorer (b. 1728)
1809 – Josiah Hornblower, American engineer and politician (b. 1729)
1814 – Jacques-Henri Bernardin de Saint-Pierre, French botanist and author (b. 1737)
1823 – Cayetano José Rodríguez, Argentinian cleric, journalist, and poet (b. 1761)
1831 – Ludwig Achim von Arnim, German poet and author (b. 1781)
1851 – Albert Lortzing, German actor and composer (b. 1801)
1862 – Božena Němcová, Austrian-Czech author and poet (b. 1820)
1870 – Alexander Herzen, Russian philosopher and author (b. 1812)
1872 – Franz Grillparzer, Austrian playwright and poet (b. 1791)
1881 – Wilhelm Matthias Naeff, Swiss lawyer and politician (b. 1802)
1891 – Calixa Lavallée, Canadian-American lieutenant and composer (b. 1842)

1901–present
1901 – Elisha Gray, American engineer, co-founded Western Electric (b. 1835)
1914 – Theodor Kittelsen, Norwegian painter and illustrator (b. 1857)
1918 – Jan Drozdowski, Polish pianist and music teacher (b. 1857)
1919 – Gojong of Korea (b. 1852)
  1919   – Ahmed Muhtar Pasha, Ottoman general and politician, 277th Grand Vizier of the Ottoman Empire (b. 1839)
1924 – Vladimir Lenin, Russian lawyer and politician (b. 1870)
1926 – Camillo Golgi, Italian physician and pathologist, Nobel Prize laureate (b. 1843)
1928 – George Washington Goethals, American general and engineer (b. 1858)
1931 – Felix Blumenfeld, Russian pianist, composer, and conductor (b. 1863)
1932 – Lytton Strachey, English writer and critic (b. 1880)
1933 – George Moore, Irish author, poet, and critic (b. 1852)
1937 – Marie Prevost, Canadian-American actress and singer (b. 1896)
1938 – Georges Méliès, French actor, director, and producer (b. 1861)
1945 – Rash Behari Bose, founder of the Indian National Army (b. 1886)
1948 – Ermanno Wolf-Ferrari, Italian composer and educator (b. 1876)
1950 – George Orwell, British novelist, essayist, and critic (b. 1903)
1955 – Archie Hahn, German-American runner and coach (b. 1880)
1959 – Cecil B. DeMille, American director, producer, and screenwriter (b. 1881)
  1959   – Frances Gertrude McGill, pioneering Canadian forensic pathologist (b. 1882)
  1959   – Carl Switzer, American child actor and hunting guide (b. 1927)
1961 – Blaise Cendrars, Swiss author and poet (b. 1887)
1963 – Acharya Shivpujan Sahay, Indian author, poet, and academic (b. 1893)
  1963   – Spiros Xenos, Greek-Swedish painter (b. 1881)
1967 – Ann Sheridan, American actress (b. 1915)
1977 – Sandro Penna, Italian poet and journalist (b. 1906)
1978 – Freda Utley, English scholar and author (b. 1898)
1983 – Lamar Williams, American bass player (b. 1949)
1984 – Giannis Skarimpas, Greek playwright and poet (b. 1893)
  1984   – Jackie Wilson, American singer (b. 1934)
1985 – James Beard, American chef and author (b. 1903)
  1985   – Eddie Graham, American wrestler and promoter (b. 1930)
1987 – Charles Goodell, American lieutenant, lawyer, and politician (b. 1926)
1988 – Vincent Lingiari, Australian Aboriginal rights activist (b. 1919)
1989 – Carl Furillo, American baseball player (b. 1922)
  1989   – Billy Tipton, American pianist and saxophonist (b. 1914)
1993 – Charlie Gehringer, American baseball player and manager (b. 1903)
1994 – Bassel al-Assad, Son of the former President of the Syrian Arab Republic Hafez al-Assad (b. 1962)
1998 – Jack Lord, American actor, director, and producer (b. 1920)
1999 – Susan Strasberg, American actress (b. 1938)
2002 – Peggy Lee, American singer (b. 1920)
2003 – Paul Haines, American-Canadian poet and songwriter (b. 1933)
  2003   – Paul Kuusberg, Estonian journalist and author (b. 1916)
2004 – Yordan Radichkov, Bulgarian author and playwright (b. 1929)
2005 – Theun de Vries, Dutch author and poet (b. 1907)
  2005   – John L. Hess, American journalist and critic (b. 1917)
  2005   – Kaljo Raid, Estonian cellist, composer, and pastor (b. 1921)
2006 – Ibrahim Rugova, Kosovo journalist and politician, 1st President of Kosovo (b. 1944)
2009 – Krista Kilvet, Estonian journalist, politician and diplomat (b. 1946)
2010 – Paul Quarrington, Canadian author, playwright, guitarist, and composer (b. 1953)
2011 – Theoni V. Aldredge, Greek-American costume designer (b. 1922)
  2011   – Dennis Oppenheim, American sculptor and photographer (b. 1938)
  2011   – E. V. V. Satyanarayana, Indian director, producer, and screenwriter (b. 1958)
2013 – Ahmet Mete Işıkara, Turkish geophysicist and academic (b. 1941)
  2013   – Chumpol Silpa-archa, Thai academic and politician, Deputy Prime Minister of Thailand (b. 1940)
  2013   – Michael Winner, English director, producer, and screenwriter (b. 1935)
2015 – Marcus Borg, American scholar, theologian, and author (b. 1942)
  2015   – Leon Brittan, English lawyer and politician, Secretary of State for Business, Innovation and Skills (b. 1939)
  2015   – Johnnie Lewis, Liberian lawyer and politician, 18th Chief Justice of Liberia (b. 1946)
2016 – Bill Johnson, American skier (b. 1960)
  2016   – Mrinalini Sarabhai, a 1992-Padma Bhushan award winner Indian classical dancer, choreographer and instructor. (b. 1918)
2019 – Kaye Ballard, American actress (b. 1925)
  2019   – Henri, Count of Paris, Head of the House of Orléans (b. 1933)
  2019   – Emiliano Sala, Argentine footballer (b. 1990)
  2019   – Harris Wofford, American politician, author and civil rights activist (b. 1926)
2020 – Terry Jones, Welsh actor, director, and screenwriter (b. 1942)
  2020   – Morgan Wootten, American high school basketball coach (b. 1931)
2022 – Louie Anderson, American actor and comedian (b. 1953)
  2022   – Leonor Oyarzún, Chilean socialite, First Lady of Chile (b. 1919)

Holidays and observances
 Babinden (Bulgaria, Serbia)
 Birthday of Princess Ingrid Alexandra (Norway) 
 Christian feast day:
 Agnes
 Demiana (Coptic Church)
 Fructuosus
 John Yi Yun-il (one of The Korean Martyrs)
 Meinrad of Einsiedeln
 January 21 (Eastern Orthodox liturgics)
 Errol Barrow Day (Barbados)
 Flag Day (Quebec)
 Grandmother's Day (Poland)
 Lady of Altagracia Day (Dominican Republic)
 Lincoln Alexander Day (Canada)
 National Hugging Day (United States)

References

External links

 BBC: On This Day
 
 Historical Events on January 21

Days of the year
January